Dempsey is both a surname and a given name.

Dempsey may also refer to:

Animals
Dempsey (dog) (1986–2003), an American pit bull terrier involved in British muzzling laws
Jack Dempsey (fish), a North and Central American fish

Culture
Dempsey and Makepeace, a British television crime drama (1984–1986)
Dempsey (film), a 1983 TV movie based on the life of the boxer Jack Dempsey

Places
Dempsey, Idaho
Dempsey, West Virginia
Avenue Général Dempsey, a street in Caen, Calvados, France, in a district close to the Mémorial pour la Paix museum, where many street-names refer to the Second World War (here, more particularly, to General Sir Miles Christopher Dempsey)
Dempsey Road, a road in Tanglin, Singapore, that is near the Singapore Botanic Gardens
Dempsey Store, a defunct hardware store that is a historic site in Toronto, Ontario, in Canada
Dempsey Wood House, a historic building in North Carolina, United States

Ships
 , the name of more than United States Navy ship

Others
Dempsey, the code name for a version of Intels Dual-Core Xeon CPU